The Moghols (also Mogul, Mongul) are Mongolic people as descendants of the Mongol Empire's soldiers in Afghanistan. They live in the Kundur and Karez-i-Mulla villages of Herat province and used to speak the Moghol language. The Moghols sometimes call themselves "Shahjahan", because some of them joined the army of Mughal Emperor Shah Jahan. Previously, Moghol villages could be found in Ghor, throughout the Hazarajat, and as far east as Badakhshan.

History 
The ancestors of the Moghols established themselves in the region in the 13th and 14th centuries serving as soldiers during the Mongol conquests. They occupied Khwarazm and the area that soon become the Ilkhanate during this period. While the Moghols used to live throughout Afghanistan, their settlements were reduced to Herat by the mid-20th century. In recent decades, most Moghols have adopted the Dari language and the Moghol language may currently be extinct as a result.

The Moghols are predominantly Sunni Muslims.

See also 
 Qara'unas
 Ethnic groups in Afghanistan
 Aimaq people
 Mughal people
 Mogol (disambiguation)
 Mughal (disambiguation)

References

Ethnic groups in Afghanistan
Mongol peoples
Modern nomads